Tlotliso Gift Leotlela (born 12 May 1998) is a South African sprinter. He competed at the 2016 Summer Olympics in the men's 200 metres race; his time of 20.59 seconds in the heats did not qualify him for the semifinals.

He competed at the 2020 Summer Olympics in the men's 100 metres event.

International competitions

Personal bests 

•All information taken from IAAF profile

References

External links
 

1998 births
Living people
South African male sprinters
Olympic athletes of South Africa
Athletes (track and field) at the 2016 Summer Olympics
Athletes (track and field) at the 2020 Summer Olympics
People from Maluti-a-Phofung Local Municipality
20th-century South African people
21st-century South African people